The Battle of Brunnbäck Ferry was the first major battle in the Swedish War of Liberation, between rebels rallied by Gustav Vasa that had marched down from occupied Falun and Danish troops from Västerås. The battle took place by the village Brunnbäck, near the ferry over Dalälven.

Governmental troops led by Henrik Slagheck, the brother of Didrik Slagheck, marched from Västerås to Dalälven, making camp near the Brunnbäck ferry. Shortly afterwards rebel troops under Peder Svensson arrived on the opposite side of the river. The rebels engaged the Danish soldiers by archery, causing many casualties and forcing the enemy to retreat. By then, Peder Svensson had already taken part of his force, and out of sight moved it over the river.

When the Danes left their camp he attacked, while the remaining rebels moved over the river. The battle took place on an open area called Sonnbohed. The governmental troops resisted, but the attack was both surprising and fierce. Those who were not cut down fled either by throwing themselves into the river or on the main road, the latter being chased far into Västmanland. The battle ended as a major Swedish victory.

References 
  

1521 in Europe
Brunnback Ferry
Brunnback Ferry
Brunnback Ferry
16th century in Denmark
1521 in Sweden
1521 in Denmark
Brunnback Ferry